Jordan Ray McCabe (born September 3, 1998) is an American college basketball player for the UNLV Runnin' Rebels of the Mountain West Conference (MWC). He previously played for the West Virginia Mountaineers.

Early life
At age 12, while attending Beaver Lake Middle School in Sammamish, Washington, he drew national attention for his dribbling ability. In December 2010, he featured in a KOMO-TV segment. In the following months, McCabe appeared on The Ellen DeGeneres Show to put on a dribbling exhibition and was showcased in an ABC News segment. He performed at halftime in collegiate and professional basketball games and at the NBA All-Star Game. In June 2011, McCabe was drafted by the Harlem Globetrotters, who intended to sign him after his graduation from college. He was held back in seventh grade as a "family decision."

High school career
McCabe was a four-year varsity basketball player for Kaukauna High School in Kaukauna, Wisconsin under head coach Michael Schalow. As a sophomore, he was named Fox Valley Association (FVA) Player of the Year and led his team to the Wisconsin Interscholastic Athletic Association (WIAA) Division 2 state championship, scoring 24 points in the title game. Before his junior year, McCabe committed to play college basketball for West Virginia over offers from DePaul, Minnesota and Missouri, among others. In his junior season, he averaged 25.1 points per game. As a senior, McCabe averaged 26.7 points and 7.8 assists per game, sharing FVA co-Player of the Year honors with Tyrese Haliburton while being named Wisconsin Mr. Basketball. He led Kaukauna to another WIAA Division 2 state championship. In the title game, McCabe led all scorers with 32 points, recorded his team's final eight points, and made the game-winning shot with 3.5 seconds left.

College career
McCabe made his debut for West Virginia in a November 9, 2018, loss to Buffalo. On February 26, 2019, he recorded 25 points, 11 assists and six steals, all of which were freshman season-highs, in 50 minutes during a 104–96 triple overtime win over TCU. McCabe became the first college player to record at least those numbers in one game since Ohio's D. J. Cooper in 2010. On March 4, he was named Big 12 Conference Newcomer of the Week. As a freshman, McCabe averaged 5.8 points and 2.5 assists per game, shooting 32.2 percent from the field, and led his team with 88 total assists. He earned Big 12 Academic All-Rookie Team honors. McCabe continued to struggle shooting the ball in his sophomore season. He scored a season-high 10 points on two occasions and averaged 3.1 points in 13.5 minutes per game, despite starting in 29 of his 31 appearances as a sophomore. As a junior, McCabe averaged 2.2 points and 1.4 assists per game. For his senior season, he transferred to UNLV.

Career statistics

College

|-
| style="text-align:left;"| 2018–19
| style="text-align:left;"| West Virginia
| 35 || 15 || 18.5 || .322 || .338 || .743 || 1.6 || 2.5 || .9 || .0 || 5.8
|-
| style="text-align:left;"| 2019–20
| style="text-align:left;"| West Virginia
| 31 || 29 || 13.5 || .311 || .209 || .760 || 1.0 || 1.6 || .5 || .0 || 3.1
|-
| style="text-align:left;"| 2020–21
| style="text-align:left;"| West Virginia
| 28 || 5 || 11.0 || .310 || .212 || .818 || 1.1 || 1.4 || .5 || .0 || 2.2
|- class="sortbottom"
| style="text-align:center;" colspan="2"| Career
|| 94 || 49 || 14.6 || .317 || .283 || .768 || 1.3 || 1.9 || .7 || .0 || 3.8

References

External links
UNLV Runnin' Rebels bio
West Virginia Mountaineers bio

Living people
1998 births
American men's basketball players
Basketball players from Wisconsin
People from Kaukauna, Wisconsin
Point guards
UNLV Runnin' Rebels basketball players
West Virginia Mountaineers men's basketball players